Lo Sing Yan (born 13 September 1973) is a Hong Kong rower. He competed in the men's lightweight double sculls event at the 2000 Summer Olympics.

References

External links
 

1973 births
Living people
Hong Kong male rowers
Olympic rowers of Hong Kong
Rowers at the 2000 Summer Olympics
Rowers at the 2002 Asian Games
Asian Games competitors for Hong Kong
21st-century Hong Kong people